is a Japanese professional football manager and former player. he is the current general manager & head coach of the Cambodia U-23.

A versatile player, Honda usually played as an attacking midfielder, but could also play as a winger, a false nine or as a deep-lying playmaker, and frequently featured as a right winger for Milan during the 2014–15 season. A quick and creative player, he was also known for his accuracy from bending free-kicks, powerful striking ability from distance, dribbling skills and delivery as a set-piece specialist.

Honda earned over 90 international caps between 2008 and 2018, playing at the 2010, 2014 and 2018 World Cups. He was also part of the squad which won the 2011 Asian Cup, where he was also voted Player of the Tournament.

Club career

Early career
Born and raised in Settsu, Honda had belonged to the local junior youth team at Gamba Osaka, but was not promoted to the youth team. When Honda was a Seiryo High School student, he made an appearance at J.League Cup as Special Designated Youth Player in 2004. After graduating high school, he began his professional career in 2005, with J1 League side Nagoya Grampus Eight.

VVV-Venlo

On 16 January 2008, Honda signed a two and half-year deal with Eredivisie side VVV-Venlo. In his first six months at VVV, he experienced relegation for the first time in his professional career as his new side went down to Eerste Divisie, the second division. In the 2008–09 season, he scored 16 goals in 36 league appearances to help the team back into the Eredivisie. He became known as Keizer Keisuke (meaning Emperor Keisuke) among the club's fans. Also, Honda introduced his agent, Tetsuro Kiyooka, to Maya Yoshida in 2008 and led him to VVV-Venlo two years later.

CSKA Moscow

At the end of December 2009, Honda transferred to Russian club CSKA Moscow. Honda signed a 4-year contract. The transfer fee was undisclosed, but VVV-Venlo was said to be very content with the fee as it almost matched their asking price; it is believed to be in the region of €6 million. Honda made his debut for CSKA in the UEFA Champions League match against Sevilla. In the second leg in Seville, he scored the winning goal through a direct free kick for CSKA after having set up the first goal for Tomáš Necid. This secured a 2–1 (3–2 aggregate) victory to send the club to the quarterfinals, making Honda the first Japanese player to be in the quarter-finals as well as the first to score in the knock-out stages. Honda scored his first league goal on 12 March 2010, in the home match against Amkar Perm. He scored the goal in the third minute of injury time, slotting home a pass from Necid with his left. With the goal, he secured the win for CSKA Moscow.

Honda picked up his first piece of silverware with CSKA on 22 May 2011, coming on as a second-half substitute for Alan Dzagoev in a 2–1 defeat of Alania Vladikavkaz in the Russian Cup final. He netted two goals in the first half of CSKA's match against Krylia Sovetov three days later, a match that ended in a 3–0 victory for his side. On 16 September 2012, Honda scored twice off passes from Ahmed Musa, scoring the only goals in a league victory over Alania.

On 13 July 2013, Honda scored CSKA's first and third goals in the club's 3–0 victory over Zenit in the Russian Super Cup match in Rostov. In 2013 summer transfer window, he entered the final six months of his contract with CSKA and became free to talk to other clubs, expressing his interest in moving to a bigger club. On 11 December 2013, CSKA announced the conclusion of Honda's time at the club.

Milan

On 27 October 2013, Milan manager Massimiliano Allegri announced a deal for Honda to join Milan on a free transfer in January 2014. Honda officially joined the team on 4 January 2014 on a contract lasting until June 2017 and wore the number 10 jersey.

On 12 January 2014, Honda made his debut coming on as a substitute for Robinho in a 4–3 Serie A defeat to Sassuolo. On 15 January, Honda made his full debut for Milan, scoring in the 3–1 Coppa Italia quarter-final win against Spezia. He scored his first Serie A goal in Genoa-Milan, which was won by the Rossoneri 1–2. Honda's contribution for Milan in the latter half of the 2013–14 season was considered disappointing, and he himself stated that "this is not me".

On 31 August 2014, Honda scored for Milan against Lazio, netting the club's first goal of the season as the Rossoneri won 3–1 in Filippo Inzaghi's Serie A debut as manager. Honda went on to score Milan's second goal against Parma on 14 September, helping Milan to win a nine-goal thriller, 5–4. Honda provided an assist for Giacomo Bonaventura's opening goal and scored a bullet header to restore Milan's lead, from Ignazio Abate's cross. In Milan's next match against Empoli, Honda drilled in a shot on the edge of the box equalizing for Milan as the sides drew 2–2. Honda scored with a precise free kick over the Chievo wall in a 2–0 win on 4 October. Honda scored his first brace playing for Milan in a 3–1 away win against Verona on 19 October. On 21 May 2017, Honda scored against Bologna winning the game and thus qualifying Milan to the Europa League for the first time since the 2013–14 season from a free kick.

Pachuca
On 14 July 2017, Mexican club Pachuca announced the signing of Honda. On 23 August 2017, Honda scored on his debut in a 4–1 win over Veracruz.

Melbourne Victory
On 6 August 2018, Honda signed for Australian A-League side Melbourne Victory. He scored on his A-League debut, in Victory's opening game of the 2018–19 A-League, a 2–1 loss to Melbourne City in the Melbourne Derby. On 3 May 2019, Honda announced that he will be leaving the club at the end of the 2018–19 A-League season, also stating that he will not be signing with an A-League team following his departure.

Vitesse
In the succeeding September, Honda publicly offered, on Twitter, to play for Manchester United and A.C. Milan. On 6 November 2019, he signed a contract for one season at Eredivisie club Vitesse Arnhem. However, after Leonid Slutsky's departure, Honda decided to also leave Vitesse after only four league appearances.

Botafogo
On 31 January 2020, Honda signed with Campeonato Brasileiro Série A side Botafogo. On 15 March, he made his debut and scored his first goal, opening the score from a penalty kick in a 1–1 draw against Bangu in the Campeonato Carioca. He left the club on 28 December, three months shy of the end of his contract, stating his frustration with the lack of results and the decisions by the club's board, which had changed head coaches four times during the season, while also thanking and apologising to the fans. He made 27 appearances across all competitions and scored three goals.

Portimonense
On 4 February 2021, Honda announced that he had reached an agreement with Primeira Liga club Portimonense. The signing was officially confirmed two days later, with Honda joining the Portuguese side on a six-month deal with the option for a one-year extension. The deal, however, broke down after Portmonense was unable to register him in the league, as a LPFP ruling required free agent players to be at least three months in that status in order to be registered outside of the transfer window period; Honda had spent less than two months out of contract. He parted ways with the club amicably on 11 February.

Neftçi
On 15 March 2021, Honda joined Azerbaijan Premier League club Neftçi PFK on a deal until the end of the season. At the end of the season, Keisuke Honda won Azerbaijan Premier League title with Neftçi.

On 16 June 2021, Neftçi confirmed that Honda had left the club after the expiration of his contract, during which he scored twice in seven games for the club.

Sūduva
On 14 September 2021, Honda joined FK Sūduva on a deal until 31 December 2021.

International career

Senior career
Honda was a member of the Japan team for 2005 FIFA World Youth Championship and played for the U-23 national team, that qualified for 2008 Summer Olympics finals. He made a full international debut for Japan on 22 June 2008 in a World Cup qualifier against Bahrain. On 14 July 2008, he was formally named as one of the midfielders of the Japanese U-23 national football team for the Beijing Olympics football competition. He scored his first goal for the senior national team on 27 May 2009 in a friendly match against Chile at Nagai Stadium in Osaka and has since been given the nickname "Emperor Keisuke". He has scored 37 goals in 98 games for the Japan national team from his debut in 2008, onwards.

2010 FIFA World Cup

Honda rose to prominence in the 2010 FIFA World Cup and became the country's newest prospect. He scored the only goal in Japan's opening match against Cameroon, finishing off Daisuke Matsui's cross into the top left corner of the net. His performance in the game gained him the Man of the Match Award from FIFA and the 1–0 victory was Japan's first World Cup triumph on foreign soil. In the final group-stage game against Denmark, he scored a magnificent free kick in the 17th minute from 30 yards out. He then turned provider for Shinji Okazaki after making his way into the penalty area, with a Cruyff Turn that beat a Denmark player, in the 88th minute to make the score 3–1 to Japan, a performance that earned him the "Man of the Match" award once more and qualified Japan for the knockout stage. In their round of 16 matchup, Japan were eliminated by Paraguay, falling 3–5 in penalty kicks after the game finished goalless through extra time.

Jonathan Wilson of The Guardian cited him as a 'false nine': a player superficially employed as a centre forward but moving deeper to pull the opposition defence around the pitch.

2011 AFC Asian Cup
Honda was included in the 2011 AFC Asian Cup by coach Alberto Zaccheroni. In the game against Syria, he scored a penalty kick making the score 2–1 for Japan. In the semi-finals against South Korea, he took a penalty kick, but was blocked by Jung Sung-Ryong. However, in the penalty shoot out of the game, he scored and was named "Man of the Match."
Honda was awarded the most valuable player of the 2011 AFC Asian Cup as Japan lifted a record fourth continental title.

2014 FIFA World Cup qualification
Honda missed the majority of the third round of AFC World Cup qualification due to injury he picked up while playing for his club.

During the fourth round of qualifying, on 3 June 2012, in Japan's first game in Group B against Oman, Honda scored a beautiful volley just eleven minutes into the game. The game ended in 3–0 a win for Japan. He continued his scoring streak against Jordan on 8 June 2012, managing to net a hat-trick; Japan went on to win 6–0. He also played a crucial role during their 1–1 draw with Australia on 12 June 2012, during a corner kick, he assisted a goal which was scored by Yuzo Kurihara.

He missed a couple of friendly games and one qualification game due to injury from club duty and was subsequently not included in the squad that was shocked 2-1 by Jordan on 26 March 2013. Although not 100 percent fit, Honda was named in the squad for the game against Australia on 4 June 2013, having just won the Russian Cup with his club. All Japan needed from this match was a draw to secure their place for Brazil. He managed to score a goal via penalty kick during extra time from a handball from Matt McKay, making the score 1–1. The result secured Japan's qualification for the World Cup in Brazil and became the first nation to book their place at the tournament.

Having won the 2011 AFC Asian Cup, Japan qualified for the Confederations Cup in Brazil in 2013 and Honda was once again included in Zaccheroni's squad for the tournament. After losing 3–0 to hosts Brazil in the first group match on 15 June 2013, Japan faced Italy in the next game; Honda scored from the penalty spot to put Japan ahead but they fell 4–3 in a pulsating game which dumped the Asian champions out of the competition.

2014 FIFA World Cup
Japan was drawn into Group C in the 2014 FIFA World Cup in Brazil having to face Colombia, Greece, and Ivory Coast. In Japan's opening game against Ivory Coast, Honda collected a pass from Yuto Nagatomo after a quick throw-in and scored with a left footed shot in the 16th minute of the game. With this goal Honda became the first Japanese player to score in two World Cups, and also claimed sole possession of being the top Japanese scorer in FIFA World Cup history with three total goals. Japan went on to lose 2–1 to the African team.

2015 AFC Asian Cup

Honda was included in Javier Aguirre's 23-man squad for 2015 AFC Asian Cup. Honda started Japan's opener match against Palestine and scored a penalty kick in their 4–0 win. In next match against Iraq, Honda again netted a penalty which Japan won the match 1–0 and the first goal in 2–0 win of Jordan.

Honda participated in Japan's quarter final match against the United Arab Emirates. After the match ended 1–1 after extra time Honda, who was Japan's first kicker in the penalty shootout, missed his kick, shooting above the crossbar, as Japan ended up losing the shootout 5–4.

2018 FIFA World Cup
On 24 June 2018, Honda scored a goal against Senegal in the second match of the group stages of Group H. With this goal he became the top scoring Asian player in World Cup history and the only player to register a goal and an assist in each of the last three tournaments. After Japan's exit in the Round of 16, Honda announced his plan to retire from the international stage.

Managerial career

Cambodia

In August 2018, whilst still a player, Honda was named general manager of Cambodia. Under this arrangement, Honda will hold weekly conference with Cambodia coaching staff, and will be on the touchline when Cambodia's match is in FIFA International match Calendar, with his assistant Felix Dalmas stepping in whenever Honda is unavailable. On 10 September 2018, Honda lost his opening game as manager of Cambodia 3–1 against Malaysia.

As of October 2021, Cambodia is last in its 2022 World Cup Qualifying Group and has suffered two extraordinary defeats to Iran, first 14–0 in late 2019 and then 10–0 in June 2021.

In January 2023, Football Federation of Cambodia (FFC) announced the 2022 AFF Championship tournament would be Honda last time with the national team. Despite not advanced to the semi-finals, Honda helped the team gain their best achievement in the AFF tournament with 2 wins, one of them against the Philippines. Honda would still continue his final duties as general manager for the Cambodia U-23 for the upcoming 2023 SEA Games.

Personal life
Coming from a sporting family, Keisuke Honda's older brother was also a footballer. Honda's great-uncle Daisaburo was a canoeist who represented Japan in C-2 1000 metres event at the 1964 Tokyo Olympics. Keisuke Honda's cousin is Tamon Honda, a professional wrestler and former Olympic wrestler, who participated in three Olympic Games in freestyle wrestling in 100 kg at the 1984, 1988 Games, and in 130 kg at the 1992 showpiece, and is also a former tag team champion, winning the All Asia Tag Team Championship and GHC Tag Team Championship.

He married Misako, his high school sweetheart. Honda has three children.

Career statistics

Club

International

Scores and results list Japan's goal tally first, score column indicates score after each Honda goal.

Managerial

Honours
VVV-Venlo
 Eerste Divisie: 2008–09

CSKA Moscow
 Russian Premier League: 2012–13
 Russian Cup: 2010–11, 2012–13
 Russian Super Cup: 2013

Milan
 Supercoppa Italiana: 2016

Neftçi PFK
 Azerbaijan Premier League: 2020–21

Japan
 AFC Asian Cup: 2011

Individual
 Eerste Divisie Player of the Year: 2008–09
 Japanese Footballer of the Year: 2010
 AFC Asian Cup Most Valuable Player: 2011
 AFC Asian Cup Quality Player: 2011
 Best Footballer in Asia: 2013
 AFC Asian Cup Fans' All-time Best XI: 2018
 IFFHS Men's Team of the Decade (AFC): 2011–2020
AFC Opta All-time World Cup XI: 2020

References

External links

 
 
 
 
 Keisuke Honda at A.C. Milan
 

1986 births
Living people
People from Settsu, Osaka
Association football people from Osaka Prefecture
Japanese footballers
Association football forwards
Association football midfielders
Nagoya Grampus players
VVV-Venlo players
PFC CSKA Moscow players
A.C. Milan players
C.F. Pachuca players
Melbourne Victory FC players
SBV Vitesse players
Botafogo de Futebol e Regatas players
Portimonense S.C. players
Neftçi PFK players
J1 League players
Eredivisie players
Eerste Divisie players
Russian Premier League players
Serie A players
Liga MX players
A-League Men players
Marquee players (A-League Men)
Campeonato Brasileiro Série A players
Azerbaijan Premier League players
Japan youth international footballers
Japan under-20 international footballers
Asian Games competitors for Japan
Olympic footballers of Japan
Japan international footballers
Footballers at the 2006 Asian Games
Footballers at the 2008 Summer Olympics
2010 FIFA World Cup players
2011 AFC Asian Cup players
2013 FIFA Confederations Cup players
2014 FIFA World Cup players
2015 AFC Asian Cup players
2018 FIFA World Cup players
AFC Asian Cup-winning players
Best Footballer in Asia
Japanese expatriate footballers
Japanese expatriate sportspeople in the Netherlands
Japanese expatriate sportspeople in Russia
Japanese expatriate sportspeople in Italy
Japanese expatriate sportspeople in Mexico
Japanese expatriate sportspeople in Australia
Japanese expatriate sportspeople in Brazil
Japanese expatriate sportspeople in Portugal
Japanese expatriate sportspeople in Azerbaijan
Expatriate footballers in the Netherlands
Expatriate footballers in Russia
Expatriate footballers in Italy
Expatriate footballers in Mexico
Expatriate soccer players in Australia
Expatriate footballers in Brazil
Expatriate footballers in Portugal
Expatriate footballers in Azerbaijan
Japanese football managers
Cambodia national football team managers
Japanese expatriate football managers
Japanese expatriate sportspeople in Cambodia
Expatriate football managers in Cambodia
Expatriate footballers in Lithuania
Expatriate footballers in Indonesia
FK Sūduva Marijampolė players